Khyri is a given name. Notable people with the name include:

 Khyri Thomas (born 1996), American basketball player
 Khyri Thornton (born 1989), American football player

See also
 Kyrie (given name)

Masculine given names